The JAC Shuailing T6 (帅铃T6) is a mid-sized pickup truck produced by JAC Motors for the Chinese market.

Overview

The JAC Shuailing T6 pickup was launched in the Chinese market in 2015, with prices ranging from 85,800 yuan to 127,800 yuan as of 2019.

The engine options of the Shuailing T6 includes the Yunnei engine and the Navistar engine. For Shuailing T6 with the Yunnei engine produces a maximum power of 70 kW/3600rpm and a torque of 240Nm/1600-2600rpm. While the Shuailing T6 with the Navistar engine is capable of delivering a maximum power of 88 kW/3600rpm and a torque of 250Nm/1800-2800, with a maximum horsepower of 120Ps.

The Shuailing T6 has a pickup bed with a dimension of 1520×1520×470mm and a LWB version in a size of 1810×1520×470mm offering higher load capacity.

Electric version
There is an all-electric version of the T6, known as the i3-T330, equipped with a 67.2-kWh battery. Another variant of the i3-T330 features the same battery but in the body of the JAC Shuailing T8 (which is also a pick-up truck but with different dimensions and styling).

References

External links
Official JAC Shuailing T6 website 

T6
Pickup trucks
All-wheel-drive vehicles
Rear-wheel-drive vehicles
Electric trucks
2010s cars